Robert L. Arrington (October 19, 1938 - June 20, 2015) was an American philosopher, specialising in moral philosophy, the philosophy of Ludwig Wittgenstein, and the philosophy of psychology.

Arrington was born in Bainbridge, Georgia, and educated at Vanderbilt University (B.A. 1960, cum laude) and Tulane University (M.A. 1962 and  Ph.D. 1966).

After three years as assistant professor at The University of Southern Mississippi (1963–1966), Arrington moved to Georgia State University, where he is professor emeritus of philosophy, and director of Wittgenstein Studies.  He has held a Woodrow Wilson Fellowship (1960) and N.D.E.A. Title IV Fellowship (1960), and received a Griffin Award from the Southern Society for Philosophy and Psychology in 1968.
He was an American Council of Learned Societies Research Fellow at the University of Oxford (1974–1975).

Books

Monographs
Rationalism, Realism, and Relativism: Perspectives in Contemporary Moral Epistemology (Ithaca: Cornell University Press, 1989)
Western Ethics (Oxford: Blackwell, 1997)
Twentieth Century Ethics (Oxford: Blackwell, forthcoming)

As editor
Wittgenstein's "Philosophical Investigations": Text and Context [co-ed. H.J. Glock] (London: Routledge, 1991)
Wittgenstein and Quine [co-ed. H.J. Glock] (London: Routledge, 1996)
A Companion to the Philosophers (Oxford: Blackwell, 1998)
Wittgenstein and Philosophy of Religion [co-ed. Mark Addis] (London: Routledge, forthcoming)

See also
American philosophy
List of American philosophers

References

1938 births
2015 deaths
People from Bainbridge, Georgia
Philosophers from Mississippi
Philosophers from Georgia (U.S. state)
Vanderbilt University alumni
Tulane University alumni
University of Southern Mississippi faculty
Georgia State University faculty